The Battle of Quingua was fought on April 23, 1899, in Quingua — now Plaridel, Bulacan, Philippines, during the Philippine–American War (1899–1902). The engagement was a two-part battle that started general Elwell S. Otis' Bulacan and Pampanga offensive a day early.  The first phase was a brief victory for the young Filipino general Gregorio del Pilar when he stopped the advance of the American Cavalry led by Major J. Franklin Bell. In the second phase of the battle, Bell was reinforced by the 1st Nebraskan Infantry, who routed the Filipinos, but not before they repelled a cavalry charge that killed Colonel John M. Stotsenburg.

Battle
The battle began when US Major Bell with the 4th Cavalry, while on a reconnaissance mission, came upon a strong Filipino position led by Colonel Pablo Tecson, a Revolutionary officer from San Miguel, Bulacan who was under command of General Gregorio del Pilar. The Filipinos laid down heavy fire which halted Bell's cavalry advance. After a short firefight, Bell recognized his position was badly exposed to the opposition, and as a result his force risked defeat. Bell sent for reinforcements, and the 1st Nebraskans came to his aid under Colonel John M. Stotsenburg, while Irving Hale sent companies from the 51st Iowa as well as artillery from the Utah Battery.

Once he arrived on the field, Stotsenburg led the Nebraskan Infantry, with a dozen or so Cavalrymen— in a charge on the enemy's position. The Filipinos held their ground and opened fire. Stotsenberg was one of the first to fall, a bullet to the heart. Several of the cavalrymen's mounts were also slain. The Filipino soldiers sustained the heavy fire, forcing the cavalrymen to retreat.

The Nebraskans, only 200 in number, continued advancing under fire by the Filipino riflemen. Despite the accuracy and intensity of the riflemen's fire, the Nebraskan line continued to advance. Inevitably, the two forces clashed in close combat, but after an exhaustive battle, the Filipinos retreated. During the fight, Hale's brigade lost 7 men killed, and 44 more men were wounded.

Legacy

References

External links
 Monument
 Tourism
South Dakota's Participation in the Spanish–American War

Further reading
Eager, Frank D. Lt. Col., History of Operations of the First Nebraska Infantry in the Campaign in the Philippine Islands. n.p. 1912. pp-30-32
 Pandia, Ralli (Feb. 1899) "Campaigning in the Philippines, Part 1", Overland Monthly, page images at Making of America, University of Michigan
Prentiss, A. ed. The History of the Utah Volunteers in the Spanish–American War and in the Philippine Islands. Salt Lake City, UT: W. F. Ford, Publisher. 1900. pp-299-303
The Abridgment. Message from the President of the United States to the Two Houses of Congress at the Beginning of the First Session of the Fifty-sixth Congress with the Reports of the Heads of Departments and Selections from Accompanying Reports. 2 vols. Washington, D.C.: GPO, 1899-1900. pp-2:972-73
War Department, Adjutant General’s Office. Correspondence relating to the War with Spain and Conditions Growing Out of the Same, Including the Insurrection in the Philippine Islands and the China relief Expedition, Between the Adjutant-General of the Army and Military Commanders in the United States, Cuba, Porto Rico, China, and the Philippine Islands, From April 15, 1898, to July 30, 1902, 2 vols. Washington, D.C.: GPO, 1902; reprint, Washington, D.C.: Center of Military History United States Army, 1993. p-972
Memories of Two Wars: Cuban and Philippine Experiences, Frederick Funston. New York: C. Scribner's Sons, Publisher. 1911. p-268
Remembering my Lolo, Simon Ocampo Tecson: Leader in the Siege of Baler, Luis Zamora Tecson. Baliwag, Bulacan: MSV Printers & Publishing, Inc., 2011. pp-105-107, 197

Quingua
1899 in the Philippines
History of Bulacan
Quingua
Quingua
April 1899 events